Saravanan Sivakumar (born 23 July 1975), known by his stage name Suriya, is an Indian actor, producer, television presenter and a philanthropist. He primarily works in Tamil cinema where he is one of the highest paid actors. He received numerous awards including two National Film Awards, six Filmfare Awards South, three Tamil Nadu State Film Awards and two South Indian International Movie Awards. Based on the earnings of Indian celebrities, Suriya has been included in the Forbes India Celebrity 100 list six times.

After making his debut in Nerukku Ner (1997) at the age of 22, Suriya landed his breakthrough role in Nandha (2001) and then had his first major commercial success with the thriller Kaakha Kaakha (2003). Following award-winning performances of a conman in Pithamagan (2003) and a hunchback in Perazhagan (2004), he played a man suffering from anterograde amnesia in the 2005 blockbuster Ghajini. He rose to stardom with dual roles of a father and son in Gautham Vasudev Menon's semi-autobiographical Vaaranam Aayiram (2008). His status as an action star was established with roles of a smuggler in Ayan (2009), and an aggressive cop in the Singam trilogy. He also found success with the science fiction films 7aum Arivu (2011) and 24 (2016) and then went on to work in critically acclaimed films like Soorarai Pottru (2020) and Jai Bhim (2021), the former of which earned him the National Film Award for Best Actor.

Suriya is the eldest child of actor Sivakumar and his younger brother Karthi is also an actor. In 2006, he married actress Jyothika whom he co-starred with in 7 films. In 2008, he began Agaram Foundation, which funds various philanthropic activities. The year 2012 marked his debut as a television presenter with the Star Vijay game show Neengalum Vellalam Oru Kodi, the Tamil version of Who Wants to Be a Millionaire?. In 2013, Suriya founded the production house 2D Entertainment.

Early life and family 
Suriya was born as Saravanan on 23 July 1975 in Madras (now Chennai), Tamil Nadu, to actor Sivakumar and his wife Lakshmi. He attended Padma Seshadri Bala Bhavan School and St. Bede's Anglo Indian Higher Secondary School in Chennai, and obtained his under graduate degree B.Com from Loyola College, Chennai. Suriya has two younger siblings, a brother Karthi and a sister Brindha.

Suriya is married to Jyothika. The couple, after being together for several years, got married on 11 September 2006. They have two children.

Career

1997–2002: Early career 
Prior to his career in films, Suriya worked at a garment exports factory for eight months. To avoid nepotism, he did not reveal himself to his boss as Sivakumar's son, but his boss ultimately learnt the truth himself. He was initially offered the lead role by Vasanth in his film Aasai (1995), but he rejected the offer citing a lack of interest in an acting career. He later debuted in Vasanth's own 1997 film Nerrukku Ner, produced by Mani Ratnam when he was 22 years of age. The stage name "Suriya" was bestowed to him by Ratnam to avoid a clash of names with established actor Saravanan. The name "Suriya" was frequently used for characters in Ratnam's films. Vijay, who co-starred with him in the film, would also go on to become a leading contemporary actor in Kollywood.

This was followed by a series of roles in commercially unsuccessful films in the late 1990s. In 1998, he starred in the romantic film Kaadhale Nimmadhi. In July the same year, he had another release Sandhippoma. Subsequently, he acted with Vijayakanth in the film Periyanna (1999), directed by S. A. Chandrasekhar. He then appeared twice with Jyothika in Poovellam Kettuppar (1999) and Uyirile Kalanthathu (2000). In 2001, he starred in Siddique's comedy film Friends, also co-starring Vijay, which became a commercial success.

Suriya confessed that he struggled due to lack of confidence, memory power, fighting or dancing skills in his early career, but it was actor Raghuvaran, one of his mentors, who advised him to create his own identity, rather than stay under his father's shadow.

His major break came in the form of the action drama Nandha, which was directed by Bala. Playing the role of an ex-convict who is very attached to his mother, he received a Tamil Nadu State Film Award for Best Actor, in addition to his first nomination for the Filmfare Award for Best Actor – Tamil. His next venture was Vikraman's romantic drama  Unnai Ninaithu followed by the action drama Sri and the romantic drama Mounam Pesiyadhe directed by Ameer Sultan, the lattermost of which earned him his second nomination for the Filmfare Award for Best Actor – Tamil.

2003–2007: Experimentation and success 

In 2003, he starred in Gautham Vasudev Menon's Kaakha Kaakha, a film about the life of a police officer. The film received positive reviews upon release with a critic from Rediff.com claiming that "Suriya as Anbu Selvan fits the role and this film is certainly a career high for him". The film emerged as Suriya's first major blockbuster at the box office and earned him his third nomination for the Filmfare Award for Best Actor – Tamil. His portrayal of a happy-go-lucky village crook with a comic touch in Bala's Pithamagan, co-starring Vikram, won him the Filmfare Award for Best Supporting Actor – Tamil. In 2004, he played dual roles in Perazhagan, as an aggressive boxer and a handicapped phone booth keeper. Suriya's performance received highly positive reviews from critics with a reviewer describing it as "Suriya deserves appreciation for his astounding performance. He is at his best be it humor or action. The actor has scored a hat trick". The film emerged as a commercial success at the box office, and Suriya won his first Filmfare Award for Best Actor – Tamil for his performance. The same year, he portrayed the role of a student leader in Mani Ratnam's political drama Aayutha Ezhuthu along with Madhavan and Siddarth. The film received high critical acclaim and was also commercially successful.

Suriya signed on to feature in the psychological thriller, Ghajini directed by A. R. Murugadoss in November 2004. He played the role of a businessman suffering from anterograde amnesia. Ghajini emerged as a blockbuster at the box office and was the third highest-grossing Tamil film of the year. Suriya's performance was unanimously praised, with a reviewer from Sify citing that "the film is driven by Suriya's riveting performance". The film was dubbed in Telugu under the same name and was again a box office success, earning him fame in Andhra Pradesh. Suriya received his fifth nomination for the Filmfare Award for Best Actor – Tamil for his performance in the film. Later that year, he worked in Hari's action film Aaru, which was moderately successful at the box office. His performance received positive reviews with a reviewer citing that "Suriya keeps you riveted to the seats with another wholesome effort".

In 2006, appeared in a cameo role in Jyothika starrer June R. In the same year he starred with Jyothika and Bhumika Chawla in N. Krishna's film Sillunu Oru Kaadhal. The film took a strong opening. It had an average response from critics, but his performance was praised, with a reviewer from Sify citing that "Suriya pitches in with yet another fantastic performance, be it the responsible husband and father, or the cool dude at college". In 2007, his only release was director Hari's Vel, where he was paired with Asin for the second time after Ghajini. The film, which featured him in dual roles, was commercially successful.

2008–2013: Continued commercial success and stardom 
His next release was another collaboration with Gautham Vasudev Menon after the success of Kaakha Kaakha. Suriya began work on Menon's biopic Vaaranam Aayiram in November 2007. Playing dual roles for the third time in his career, Suriya appeared as father and son, with both characters demanding scenes shot throughout their lives ranging from scenes as a 16-year-old to scenes as a 65-year-old. During the production of the film, Suriya described the project as "unique" and "straight from the heart", describing the physical hardships he endured during the making. He lost weight and prepared a six pack for the film through an eight-month fitness regime without steroids, with the move being a trend-setter for other leading actors from South India. The film, which also featured Simran, Sameera Reddy and Divya Spandana in prominent roles, became commercially successful at the box office upon release and received positive reviews from film critics, with Suriya's performance being lauded. A critic from Rediff labelled the film as his "magnum opus", citing that he is "perfect" and that the film for him is a "justified triumph". Similarly, critics cited Suriya's performance as "outstanding" and claimed that the film "works because of his performance", whilst other reviewers claimed the film was an "out and out Suriya show". His portrayals also fetched him several notable awards, including his second Filmfare Award for Best Actor – Tamil, a Tamil Nadu State Film Award Special Prize and the Vijay Award for Best Actor for 2008. The film also went on to receive a National Film Award for Best Feature Film in Tamil for 2008.

In 2009, Suriya's first release was K. V. Anand's action-thriller Ayan. With Suriya portraying the role of a smuggler, the film also featured Prabhu as his guardian and Tamannaah Bhatia as the lead actress. The film was shot extensively across Tanzania, Namibia, Malaysia and India and featured acrobatic stunts by Suriya, without the use of a stunt double. Upon release, it received positive reviews, with critics citing the film as a "must watch" and Suriya's performance was yet again acclaimed and he found himself nominated for leading awards and won the Vijay Award for Entertainer of the Year, in addition to his seventh nomination for the Filmfare Award for Best Actor – Tamil. The film's success saw Suriya emerge as the most profitable leading actor in Tamil films, following a hattrick of large commercial hits, with film journals suggesting that his success was due to "experiments within the commercial format" and he was successful in "avoiding being typecast". The film ran 100 days in 3 states (Tamil Nadu, Kerala and Andhra Pradesh). Ayan was the highest-grossing Tamil film of 2009.

His next film, K. S. Ravikumar's action entertainer Aadhavan also achieved commercial success, while Suriya's depiction of a hitman was praised. A critic from Sify.com labelled it as an "out and out Suriya show", stating that "the film rides on the magic of the actor, and his zany shenanigans alone makes it worth a watch" and Rediff.com cited that "he sings, dances, and fights with absolute sincerity, but when he looks at you with tears in his eyes in an emotional scene tailor-made for him, the applause hits the roof", concluding that it is "completely his film". In 2010, he starred in his 25th release, Singam directed by Hari, in which he played the role of a police officer from a small village going to work in the city. The film received positive reviews with The Hindu newspaper noting that "Suriya shows that be it a performance-oriented role or a formulaic concoction he can deliver", while Sify.com stated "Ultimately it is Suriya who carries the film to the winning post. His passion and the way he brings an ordinary regular larger-than-life hero character alive on screen is lesson for other commercial heroes." Indian cricketer Mahendra Singh Dhoni stated that he became "a great fan of Suriya" after watching Singam. The film won Suriya his second Vijay Award for Best Entertainer, in addition to his eighth nomination for the Filmfare Award for Best Actor – Tamil, and subsequently went on to become the second highest-grossing film of the year. He made his Telugu and Hindi debut in the second part of Ram Gopal Varma's political drama Rakta Charitra in 2010. The film was released in Tamil as Ratha Sarithiram, which was partly dubbed and partly reshot. Suriya subsequently went on to appear as himself in three consecutive guest appearances, appearing alongside Trisha and Madhavan in a song in Manmadhan Ambu (2010), before also starring in K. V. Anand's Ko and Bala's Avan Ivan (2011).

His only release in 2011 that featured him in a starring role was A. R. Murugadoss's science fiction action thriller 7aum Arivu. Suriya played dual roles and starred alongside Shruti Haasan in the film, as a circus artist and as the Buddhist monk named Bodhidharma, who lived in the 6th century. The film met with mixed reviews, but was a commercial success and became his first film to gross above 1 billion, and earned him his ninth nomination for the Filmfare Award for Best Actor – Tamil. 

His 2012 release was the K. V. Anand-directed action thriller Maattrraan in which he played the role of conjoined twins, Vimalan and Akhilan. The film received mixed reviews, and ended up being an average grosser. Critics however praised the film's technical aspects and VFX, in addition to Suriya's performance, which earned him his tenth nomination for the Filmfare Award for Best Actor – Tamil. Suriya himself dubbed for one of his characters in the Telugu dubbed version of the film.

In January 2012, Suriya was named as the official host of the new game show to be presented on STAR Vijay, Neengalum Vellalam Oru Kodi, the Tamil version of Who Wants to Be a Millionaire?. It began airing on 27 February 2012 and ended on 12 July. His next film was Singam II, a sequel to his 2010 film Singam. The film released on 5 July 2013 to mixed reviews from critics. However, the film received a huge opening and emerged one of the highest grossing Tamil films of all time. Suriya was once again acclaimed for his portrayal of Durai Singam and his performance was hailed as "the film's backbone". Singam II was a box office hit and became his second ₹1 billion grosser. Suriya received his eleventh nomination for the Filmfare Award for Best Actor – Tamil for his performance in the film. Suriya distributed the film through his production company 2D Entertainment, founded in 2013. He had signed on to feature in Gautham Vasudev Menon's film Dhruva Natchathiram and reportedly waited for six months to start filming. However, in October 2013, he backed out due to differences with the director and the project lagging too much. In a 2013 interview with the Bangalore Mirror, film producer G. Dhananjayan called Suriya as the "biggest star" in contemporary Tamil cinema and claimed it was mainly because his popularity extended to Telugu and Malayalam speaking audiences as well.

2014–2019: Career struggles and sporadic success 
His next film Anjaan directed by N. Lingusamy was released on 15 August 2014 to mixed reviews. He also co-sang "Ek Do Theen Char" with Andrea Jeremiah for the film. On 15 May 2015, Suriya released 36 Vayadhinile starring his wife Jyothika, the first production from his company 2D Entertainment. His next release was Venkat Prabhu's film Massu Engira Masilamani (Masss) which released to unfavourable reviews, but critics were all in praise for Suriya's performance. In the same year Suriya produced Pasanga 2 (2015), directed by Pandiraj. Suriya also appears in an extended cameo role in the film as Tamizh Nadan.

His next release was the science-fiction action drama 24 directed by Vikram Kumar. It was released on 6 May 2016 to positive reviews. Based on the concept of time-travel, the film stars Suriya in triple roles, alongside actresses Samantha Ruth Prabhu and Nithya Menen in leading roles. The Hindu critic Baradwaj Rangan called 24 an "intelligent, joyous mix of sci-fi and masala-myth." Sreedhar Pillai in his review for Firstpost mentioned, 24 is a classy commercial entertainer, which has its moments. Malini Mannath of The New Indian Express wrote, "Attractively packaged, 24 is refreshing, novel and worth a watch." M. Suganth of The Times of India, assigned 4 out of 5 stars, stating: "It is not often that we see a big star choosing to take a risk with a script that is not simplistic or formulaic, especially when his last few films have underperformed at the box office, but here Suriya pulls it off admirably." IndiaGlitz.com rated the film 3.25 out of 5 and called it "A beautiful and brilliant show of time". For his performance in the film, Suriya won the Filmfare Award for Best Actor (Critics) – Tamil, in addition to his twelfth nomination for the Filmfare Award for Best Actor – Tamil. The film also grossed above ₹1 billion at the box office worldwide. The director Vikram Kumar had announced plans for a sequel, called 24 Decoded.

His next film S3, the third film of the Singam franchise, was released on 9 February 2017 and emerged another 1 billion grosser. His only release in 2018 was Thaana Serndha Kootam directed by Vignesh Shivan and produced by Studio Green with music done by Anirudh Ravichander. The Telugu dubbed version received praise for Suriya's dubbing. In the same year, he produced Kadaikutty Singam, starring his brother Karthi, and co-sang "Cha Cha Charey" with Karthi, Kharesma Ravichandran, Venkat Prabhu and Premgi Amaren for the movie Party. The first of his two releases in 2019, Selvaraghavan's NGK, released on 31 May 2019. The second, K. V. Anand's Kaappaan marked the third time he collaborated with the director. Although the film received mixed reviews from critics, it ended up being a commercial success. He also produced Uriyadi 2 and Jackpot in 2019.

2020–present: Career resurgence 
His next film, the biographical drama Soorarai Pottru, was based on the life of Air Deccan founder Captain G. R. Gopinath. It was directed by Sudha Kongara, produced by Suriya's 2D Entertainment and co-produced by Guneet Monga under Sikhya Entertainment. He sang "Maara Theme" and its Telugu version "Maha Theme" for the film, which was released directly on Amazon Prime Video on 12 November 2020. The film received widespread critical acclaim and won Suriya his first National Film Award for Best Actor, in addition to his third Filmfare Award for Best Actor – Tamil. The film became the most-watched regional language film in the history of Amazon Prime in India.

His next work Navarasa, a Netflix anthology series produced by Mani Ratnam, was released on 6 August 2021. He acted in the 9th episode titled Guitar Kambi Mele Nindru, directed by Gautham Vasudev Menon. The artists, technicians and directors of the series contributed towards the film without remuneration, with only the costs of production being associated. The profits earned from the project were donated to the members of the Film Employees Federation of South India (FEFSI), who were affected by the COVID-19 pandemic. 

He then played Justice K. Chandru in T. J. Gnanavel's legal drama Jai Bhim. The film, which was his own production, was distributed by Amazon Prime Video on 2 November 2021. It received positive reviews from critics, who praised the story, performances, direction and social message, and several publications listed the film as "one of the best Tamil and Indian films of 2021". The film was shortlisted among the 276 films eligible for nomination at the 94th Academy Awards, but failed to make the final list of nominations. Jai Bhim also became the first Indian film to be featured on the Oscars' YouTube channel. Suriya won the Filmfare Award for Best Film – Tamil as producer of the film, and received his fourteenth nomination for the Filmfare Award for Best Actor – Tamil for his performance in the film, but lost the award to his performance in Soorarai Pottru. The same year, he produced two films, Raame Aandalum Raavane Aandalum and Udanpirappe.

Suriya's next film Etharkkum Thunindhavan, also known under the initialism ET, directed by Pandiraj and produced by Kalanithi Maran under Sun Pictures released in theatres on 10 March 2022 to mixed reviews. Following that, he appeared in a cameo as Rolex in Lokesh Kanagaraj's Vikram starring Kamal Haasan, Vijay Sethupathi and Fahadh Faasil. The film is part of the Lokesh Cinematic Universe. He also appeared as himself in R. Madhavan's Rocketry: The Nambi Effect. Suriya also confirmed that he would have a cameo in the Hindi remake of Soorarai Pottru, an own production with Akshay Kumar in the lead. The same year, Suriya became the first South Indian actor to be invited to join the Academy of Motion Picture Arts and Sciences. He was among 397 eminent film personalities invited to join the Academy for the 95th Academy Awards.

After the release of Etharkkum Thunindhavan, Suriya started work on Bala's Vanangaan. However, in December 2022, it was confirmed that he left the project due to differences with the director. Suriya's other productions in 2022 were Oh My Dog and Viruman. He is currently working on an untitled film directed by Siva and produced jointly by Studio Green and UV Creations. The film is tentatively called Suriya 42 and features Disha Patani as the female lead.

Activism 
 In 2007, Suriya was the brand ambassador of Tanker Foundation and also acted in a short film on AIDS awareness. He has also lent his voice to other noble causes such as "Save The Tigers" campaign, which aids in the protection and preservation of Tigers in India, and "REACH", a non-profit that cures TB patients for free using supervised medication programs. In 2019, Suriya criticised the union government's Draft National Education Policy (NEP), claiming that several of its features would affect students from rural areas. He said the policy sought to impose entrance and qualifying examination on students and the three language formula in Tamil Nadu. His statements were criticized by BJP and AIADMK leaders.

Suriya issued a statement on National Eligibility cum Entrance Test (NEET) in September 2020 after three students committed suicide. He criticized the government for enacting laws that created inequalities and criticized the judiciary saying that "while the court is run through video conferencing, they have ordered students to take the exams in person during COVID-19". He referred to NEET as "manuneethi" and compared it to a tale in the Mahabharata in which Drona demanded Ekalavya's thumb as payment for training and said "the skills and abilities of our children should not be determined by one test". He asked people to raise their voice against the NEET which "prevents medical courses to students from normal families". Madras High court judge S.M. Balasubramaniam urged the chief justice to take contempt action against Suriya but this was opposed by six retired judges. Suriya's wife Jyothika had on a separate occasion requested to contribute to schools and hospitals the same as temples. The Bharatiya Janata Party (BJP) and other right-wing organisations condemned them while they garnered widespread support from people advocating equal access to healthcare and education.

Philanthropy 

In 2006, Suriya began Agaram Foundation, working to help children who drop out of school early in Tamil Nadu. Suriya revealed that he was inspired to begin the movement as a result of his father's own organisation, Sivakumar Educational Trust, which had been operating similar benefits on a smaller scale since the 1980s. With the Ministry of Education in Tamil Nadu, the foundation created a short commercial video outlining child poverty, labour and lack of education, titled Herova? Zerova?. The film was written and produced by Sivakumar and also starred Vijay, Madhavan and Jyothika. Agaram sponsored 159 underprivileged students in 2010 for their higher education in various disciplines, and has continued to provide free seats and accommodation for pupils. With the firm belief that the educated mind can not only eliminate social evils but also aid in the socio-economic upbringing of society, Agaram Foundation works towards providing appropriate learning opportunities to the rural populace who do not otherwise have access to quality education. Through the foundation, he has also set up a platform for students to participate in workshops and improve communication skills, teamwork, goal setting and leadership.

Other work 
In 2004, Suriya was Pepsi's brand ambassador in Tamil Nadu along with R. Madhavan. He was chosen to represent TVS Motors, Sunfeast Biscuits and Aircel in 2006. He had endorsed Saravana Stores, Bharathi Cements and Emami Navaratna products in 2010. In 2011, he had signed new deals with Nescafe, Close-Up and Zandu Balm, for the latter of which he appeared with actress Malaika Arora. In 2012, Suriya endorsed Malabar Gold and Diamonds. The commercials for Aircel and Nescafe featured Suriya and his wife Jyothika together. In 2013, he was honored at the Edison Awards as the Best Male Endorser in South India. In 2014, he promoted Complan energy drinks. In 2015, Suriya was named as the brand ambassador for Quikr and Intex Moblies. Based on the earnings of Indian celebrities, Suriya was included in the Forbes India Celebrity 100 list for 2012, 2013, 2015, 2016, 2017 and 2018. His peak ranking on the list was #25 in the year 2017.

References

External links 
 
 
 

1975 births
Living people
20th-century Indian male actors
21st-century Indian male actors
Loyola College, Chennai alumni
Male actors in Hindi cinema
Male actors in Tamil cinema
Male actors from Chennai
Best Actor National Film Award winners
Tamil Nadu State Film Awards winners
Filmfare Awards South winners
Padma Seshadri Bala Bhavan schools alumni
Recipients of the Kalaimamani Award
International Tamil Film Award winners